South Texas Preparatory Academy, also known as 'STPA', is part of the South Texas Independent School District, in Edinburg, Texas, United States.

STPA is a tuition-free magnet junior high school for students in a three-county area along the Texas-Mexico border. This is located in Edinburg, Texas. (Hidalgo, Willacy and Cameron )

The school was founded in 2008 as South Texas Preparatory Academy. It previously shared the name South Texas BETA with its neighboring South Texas Business Education & Technology Academy from 2003–2008, and before that it was named the Teacher Academy of South Texas. In 2008 the South Texas ISD School Board decided to split up the Jr. High and High School, which are now independently their own name, STPA and BETA, respectively.

STPA serves 6th, 7th, and 8th grade, after leaving STPA, students choose to go to one of four high schools in the STISD district; South Texas Business Education & Technology Academy, The Science Academy of South Texas, South Texas High School for Health Professions, and South Texas ISD Medical Proffesions. It has also been recognized as a blue ribbon school in the 2015–2016 academic school year.

References

External links
Official Website

Public middle schools in Texas
Schools in Hidalgo County, Texas
Education in Edinburg, Texas
Buildings and structures in Edinburg, Texas
Magnet schools in Texas
South Texas Independent School District schools